Theodorus "Theo" Henricus Maria Rasing (born 26 May 1953) is a Dutch professor of experimental physics at Radboud University Nijmegen. His expertise lies in the field of magneto-optics. He was a winner of the 2008 Spinoza Prize.

Career
Rasing was born on 26 May 1953 in Didam. In 1976 he obtained a cum laude degree in physics from Radboud University Nijmegen. He obtained his doctorate from the same university in 1982. In 1997 he became professor at Radboud University Nijmegen.

In 2008 he was one of four winners of the Dutch Spinoza Prize and received a 1,5 million euro grant. In 2013 Rasing won a 2,5 million euro Advanced Grant by the European Research Council for a research proposal titled 'magnetisation at its fastest'.

Rasing was elected a member of the Royal Netherlands Academy of Arts and Sciences in 2010. In the same year he was made a Knight of the Order of the Netherlands Lion. Rasing was elected a member of the Academia Europaea in 2013.

In February 2015 the Dutch newspaper de Volkskrant listed Rasing second on a list of funds obtained by researchers.

References

External links
 Profile on Radboud University Nijmegen

1953 births
Living people
20th-century Dutch physicists
European Research Council grantees
Experimental physicists
Knights of the Order of the Netherlands Lion
Magneticians
Members of Academia Europaea
Members of the Royal Netherlands Academy of Arts and Sciences
Optical physicists
People from Montferland
Radboud University Nijmegen alumni
Academic staff of Radboud University Nijmegen
Spinoza Prize winners